Agent X is an American action drama television series which aired from November 8 to December 27, 2015 on TNT. It stars Sharon Stone, Jeff Hephner, Jamey Sheridan, John Shea and Mike Colter.

On December 15, 2015, TNT canceled the series after one season. The show was also broadcast on Bravo (Canada) days after.

Plot
After becoming United States Vice President, Natalie Maccabee (Sharon Stone) is informed that there is a secret paragraph in the U.S. Constitution creating a special agent to help protect the country in times of crisis, under instruction of the Vice President. John Case (Jeff Hephner), former Special Forces operator, is the current operative "Agent X", who handles sensitive cases that the CIA and the FBI cannot.

Cast
Sharon Stone as Vice President Natalie Maccabee
Jeff Hephner as John Case
Jamey Sheridan as Edwin Stanton
John Shea as President Thomas Eckhart
Mike Colter as Miles Lathem
Gerald McRaney as Malcolm Millar
Olga Fonda as Olga Petrovka
James Earl Jones as Chief Justice of the United States Caleb Thorne
Andrew Howard as Nicolas Volker / Raymond Marks

Episodes

Production
Agent X was produced by TNT Originals in association with Beacon Pictures. Armyan Bernstein and Sharon Stone are executive producers. William Blake Herron, who also executive-produced, wrote the pilot, which was directed by Peter O'Fallon.

Critical reception
On Metacritic, the show holds a rating of 43/100, based on 15 reviews. On Rotten Tomatoes, it has a 28% approval rating based on 18 reviews, with an average rating of 5.8/10. The critics' consensus reads: "Unintentionally hilarious, poorly paced, and overall redundant, Agent X is a secret agent drama that should have remained secret."

The New York Times said in a review of the series  "Without the jokey bravado (or high production values) of Strike Back or the charming wonkiness of Warehouse 13, the only claim Agent X has on our attention is Ms. Stone. Even that is tenuous — while her performance loosens up a bit across the first four episodes, her screen time appears to shrink."

Variety wrote in their review "Possessing some of the flavor of National Treasure, Agent X takes the amusing step of investing the Vice President's office with secret constitutional powers, all for the purpose of concocting a Yankee version of James Bond. And wonder of wonders, it mostly works, at least initially, combining a sense of playfulness with bountiful action and, less successfully, a sweeping conspiracy.

The Wall Street Journal called Agent X an "improbable but high-action thriller." Also saying "This light and fast-moving version of an America-in-peril espionage thriller doesn't really deal in moral ambiguity and shades of gray."

References

External links
 
 

2010s American drama television series
2015 American television series debuts
2015 American television series endings
American action television series
English-language television shows
TNT (American TV network) original programming
Espionage television series
Television series by Warner Bros. Television Studios